Political socialization is the process by which individuals learn and frequently internalize a political lens framing their perceptions of how power is arranged and how the world around them is (and should be) organized; those perceptions, in turn, shape and define individuals' definitions of who they are and how they should behave in the political and economic institutions in which they live." Political socialization also encompasses the way in which people acquire values and opinions that shape their political stance and ideology: it is a "study of the developmental processes by which people of all ages and adolescents acquire political cognition, attitudes, and behaviors."It refers to a learning process by which norms and behaviors acceptable to a well running political system are transmitted from one generation to another. It is through the performance of this function that individuals are inducted into the political culture and their orientations towards political objects are formed. Schools, media, and the state have a major influence in this process.

Agents of socialization
Agents of socialization, sometimes referred to as institutions, work together to influence and shape people's political and economic norms and values. Such institutions include, but are not limited to: families, media, peers, schools, religions, work and legal systems.

Agents
 Family: Families perpetuate values that support political authorities and can heavily contribute to children's initial political ideological views, or party affiliations. Families have an effect on "political knowledge, identification, efficacy, and participation", depending on variables such as "family demographics, life cycle, parenting style, parental level of political cynicism and frequency of political discussions."  
 Schools: Spending numerous years in school, children in the United States are taught and reinforced a view of the world that "privileges capitalism and ownership, competitive individualism, and democracy." Through primary, secondary and high schools, students are taught key principles such as individual rights and property, personal responsibility and duty to their nation. 
 Media: Mass media is not only a source of political information; it is an influence on political values and beliefs. Various media outlets, through news coverage and late-night programs, provide different partisan policy stances that are associated with political participation. 
 Religion: Religious beliefs and practices play a role in political opinion formation and political participation. This is evident, for instance, in Arab societies where there is no clear distinction between political cultures and religions. The theological and moral perspectives offered by religious institutions shape judgement regarding public policy, and ultimately, translates to direct "political decision making on governmental matters such as the redistribution of wealth, equality, tolerance for deviance and the limits on individual freedom, the severity of criminal punishment, policies relating to family structure, gender roles, and the value of human life."
 Political parties: Scholars such as Campbell (1960) note that political parties have very little direct influence on a child due to a contrast of social factors such as age, context, power, etc.
  The state: The state is a key source of information for media outlets, and has the ability to "inform, misinform, or disinform the press and thus the public", a strategy which may be referred to as propaganda, in order to serve a political or economic agenda.

Media's effects

In children 
Political socialization begins in childhood. Some research suggests that family and school teachers are the most influential factors in socializing children, but recent research designs have more accurately estimated the high influence of the media in the process of political socialization. On average, both young children and teenagers in the United States spend more time a week consuming television and digital media than they spend in school. Young children consume an average of thirty-one hours a week, while teenagers consume forty-eight hours of media a week. High school students attribute the information that forms their opinions and attitudes about race, war, economics, and patriotism to mass media much more than their friends, family, or teachers. Research has also shown that children who consume more media than others show greater support for and understanding of American values, such as free speech. This may be because eighty percent of the media content children consume is intended for an adult audience. In addition, the impact of the messages is more powerful because children's brains are "prime for learning", thus more likely to take messages and representations of the world at face value.

In adulthood 
Media's role into political socialization continues in adulthood through both fictional and factual media sources. Adults have increased exposure to news and political information embedded in entertainment; fictional entertainment (mostly television) is the most common source for political information. The culmination of information gained from entertainment becomes the values and standards by which people judge.

While political socialization by the media is lifelong process, after adolescence, people's basic values generally do not change. Most people choose what media they are exposed to based on their already existing values, and they use information from the media to reaffirm what they already believe. Studies show two-thirds of newspaper readers do not know their newspaper's position on specific issues- and most media stories are quickly forgotten. Studies on public opinion of the Bush administration's energy policies show that the public pays more attention to issues that receive a lot of media coverage, and forms collective opinions about these issues. This demonstrates that the mass media attention to an issue affects public opinion. More so, extensive exposure to television has led to "mainstreaming", aligning people's perception of political life and society with television's portrayal of it.

Patterns 
There are different patterns in socialization based on race, ethnicity, gender, age, income, education, geographic region, and city size. For example, generally, African Americans and Hispanics rely on television for their information more than white people. More women than men watch daytime television, and more men than women follow sports programs. Older people read more newspapers than younger people, and people from the ages of twelve to seventeen (although they consume the most media) consume the least amount of news. Northerners listen to radio programs more than Southerners do. News outlets on the East Coast tend to cover international affairs in Europe and the Middle East the most, while West Coast news outlets are more likely to cover Asian affairs; this demonstrates that region affects patterns in media socialization. Income level is also an important factor; high-income families rely more on print media than television, and consume less television than most of the population.

Ultimately, however, the common core of information, and the interpretation the media applies to it, leads to a shared knowledge and basic values throughout the United States. Most media entertainment and information does not vary much throughout the country, and it is consumed by all types of audiences. Although there are still disagreements and different political beliefs and party affiliations, generally there are not huge ideological disparities among the population because the media helps create a broad consensus on basic US democratic principles.

See also 
 Cohort effect
 Groupthink
 Public opinion
 Political culture
Political cognition

References

Socialization
Socialization